John Andrews (13 April 1934 – 23 March 2000) was a British professional racing cyclist. He rode in the 1960 Tour de France.

References

External links
 

1934 births
2000 deaths
British male cyclists
People from Ramsgate
Sportspeople from Kent
20th-century British people